Idalia Albertini (born Genoa) was an Italian sculptor, active between the 1890s and the 1930s.

Life 
Idalia Albertini was specialized in genre and animalier themed sculptures. 

She studied in Tuscany with Salvatore Albano and Augusto Passaglia . 

In 1891 she exhibited the marble bust Nidia the blind at the 1891 Brera Triennale . 

In 1908,  she created the bronze bust of Francesco Colzi for Monsummano Terme . 

In 1913, she participated in the Italian section in the II International Women's Exhibition of Fine Arts in Turin, exhibiting a statue of a dancer and a series of bronze plaques depicting Wagner , Beethoven , Bjorson , Le Fates and Bernardo Degli Uberti. 

In the autumn of 1914, she took part in the National Exhibition of Fine Arts at the Royal Brera Academy with a plaster funeral plaque. 

In 1931,  she presented her works Elephant and Putti at the Montecatini Terme. 

In the 1990s, a retrospective exhibition in Monsummano was held.

References 

19th-century Italian sculptors
20th-century Italian sculptors
Italian women sculptors
Year of birth missing

Year of death missing